Pseudopharus amata is a moth in the family Erebidae first described by Herbert Druce in 1900. It is found in Venezuela and Peru.

References

Phaegopterina
Arctiinae of South America
Moths described in 1900